Curtis Lester Mendelson (September 4, 1913 - October 13, 2002) was an obstetrician and American cardiologist.
Mendelson's syndrome was named after him in 1946.

References 

American obstetricians
1913 births
2002 deaths
American cardiologists